Chalbury Hill And Quarry is an 11.9 hectare biological and geological Site of Special Scientific Interest in Dorset, England, notified in 1977. The site consists of grassland (10.3 hectare) and a disused limestone quarry (1.6 hectare). The SSSI includes the area covered by Chalbury Hill Fort.

References
 English Nature citation sheet for the site (accessed 31 August 2006)

External links
 English Nature website (SSSI information)

Sites of Special Scientific Interest in Dorset
Sites of Special Scientific Interest notified in 1977
Hills of Dorset
Geology of Dorset
Quarries in Dorset